TV1 was a private Estonian television channel. It included news, current affairs, sports and general entertainment. The channel was founded by AS Eesti Sõltumatu Televisioon (Estonian Independent Television) of the Sõnajalgs in 1997 and was sold to Polsat in 2000. Since Polsat gave excessive amounts of kroons to TV1 just to pay its debts, coupled with uncertainties during the Sõnajalg administration, they decided to shut the channel down on October 3, 2001 after four years.

History
Founded in February 1997 by the Sõnajalg family (Oleg and Andres Sõnajalg), the owners wanted TV1 to be a news channel. In June 1998 the shares were transferred to Ühispank under the condition that it would invest 25 million kroons for the channel within a month. The bank invested such value on delay. Vallo Toomet, who was in charge of reformulating the channel, paid the salary based on loan contracts. Therefore, the company had to delay a 10 million kroon payment in state debts.

On 14 November 1998, the Sõnajalgs left Estonia, having quit TV1's management because they were no longer operating in the station for its workers, but for their personal interests. Oleg and Andres Sõnajalg wrote a document that would have allowed them to carry out the decision of the TV1 supervisory board to leave the mediation of ORTV advertising to themselves, but not to Ühispank and TV1. According to unconfirmed data, the brothers tried to take control of the entire ORTV project and disconnect it from TV1.

Vallo Toomet, Chairman of the Board of Directors of TV1, located the document prepared on a computer on 12 November, the eve of the Fiscal Council meeting. The Sõnajalgs were informed of their exclusion from the council the next day, just before the Council meeting. TV1 and Ühispank executives used gang language when commenting on the Sõnajalg's expulsion of the council.

Janek Mäggi, Deputy Governor of Ühispank, and Vallo Toomet, Chairman of the Board of Directors of TV1, said nothing about the removal of Oleg and Andres Sõnajalg from the Supervisory Board. According to Toomet, TV1 didn't demand anything from the Sõnajalgs. A staff member said that there was possibly retaliation from TV1. The Sõnajalgs later fled to Stockholm and, according to several reports, fled to either the Netherlands or Portugal. There was speculation over whether of not the expulsion of the Sõnajalgs was related to the TV1 scandal.

In February 1999, the Sõnajalgs financed the establishment of TV1 with debts of 23 million kroons to Ühispank. In order to get the money back, the bank intended to sell the family's property. Ühispank announces that during 1999 the television station was to be sold for 90 million kroons.

In March 1999, representatives of the Finnish network MTV3 went to Tallinn to negotiate the sell of TV1. Ühispank president Ain Hanschmidt said that the sell wasn't in a hurry because the station was working normally and that there were no problems at the time. The Sõnajalgs didn't answer to the news of the sell of the station.

In December 1999, Ühispank's shares were sold to Lõhmus, Haavel & Viisemann. Rait Killandi, up until then the advertising manager, became the director of programming. According to Killandi, the station was still operating at a loss, albeit ten times smaller compared to the one it had under its previous owners and had no debts to its employees.

By then a plan was announced suggesting that the channel was to be sold to the Polish commercial network Polsat, owned by businessman Zygmunt Solorz-Żak. Polsat also bought LNT in Latvia and BTV in Lithuania, with the aim of merging the three channels' managements and establishing a Baltic television network.

Polsat was now owning TV1 in December 2000. In May 2001, owing to challenges related to its reduced viewing share, the group invests 178 million kroons in order to keep the operations afloat. In September 2001, Rait Killandi, president of the Council of Administration, put the channel at a crossroads, demanding it to either continue operating or closing it down. On 18 September, Polsat promised giving money to TV1, in order to pay its debts, with a speculated amount of up to 10 million kroons. Finally on 3 October, TV1 shut down as it was owing more than a million kroons.

References

Defunct television channels in Estonia
Television channels and stations established in 1997
Television channels and stations disestablished in 2001
1997 establishments in Estonia
2001 disestablishments in Estonia
Mass media in Tallinn